Minnie Devereaux (1869–1923) was an American silent film actress. She was a member of the Cheyenne and Arapaho Tribes in Oklahoma.
More commonly known as "Minnie Provost" and occasionally "Indian Minnie," or "Minnie Ha-Ha," she held at least 14 roles, beginning in 1913 with Old Mammy’s Secret Code and ending with the 1923 release of The Girl of the Golden West. A few sources say she was a Cheyenne and the daughter of a Chief Plenty Horses. However, her father is often confused with Plenty Horses who was Lakota and born the same year as Minnie. In a 1917 interview published in the Mack Sennett Weekly Provost states that she was born to Cheyenne parents who fled G. A. Custer's Army during the Battle of the Little Bighorn, an event that took place when she was eight years old.

Early life 
Provost was born in the Oklahoma Territory in a small town named Canadian, Oklahoma. Movie trade magazines claimed she studied at the Carlisle Indian Industrial School, a Pennsylvania boarding school for Native American students, and she appears on the Carlisle rolls as Minerva Burgess of Cheyenne and Arapaho heritage. Her father is listed as "Plenty of Horses", not to be confused with Plenty Horses.

Early career

Fatty and Minnie He-Haw 
The actress starred alongside Roscoe Arbuckle in the 1914 silent comedy film Fatty and Minnie He-Haw, directed by Arbuckle. She is featured as a Native American, whom Arbuckle reluctantly marries after being rescued by her tribe. Arbuckle pursues a white woman in town, played by his real-life wife Minta Durfee, but is driven back when He-Haw discovers his disloyalty. Outraged, the tribe prepares to burn him for his traitorous behavior, but He-Haw spares him in an act of love. He-Haw chases her man but ultimately loses him when he disappears into the hills with angry warriors trailing behind.

Other works 
Provost worked with producer and "king of comedy" Mack Sennett on Fatty and Minnie He-Haw, as well as the 1918 film Mickey and the 1922 film Suzanna, both directed by F. Richard Jones. In 1920 Minnie worked with director James Cruze on Food for Scandal, the cinematic version of Paul Kester's play A Picture of Rare Delight. Provost was an actress in demand, working with various production companies on the east coast, including Kay-Bee Pictures, the New York Motion Picture Company, and Sennett's Keystone Studios.

Reputation 
The actress was heralded as a dignified professional who could easily perform slapstick comedy as well as melodrama.

She was subject to typecasting, with roles that capitalized upon her heavy frame and her Native American heritage. Reviews at the time often referred to Indian women as a squaw in reference to her characters' titles within such films. Peter Milne, a film critic and eventual screenwriter, berated Provost for her age and appearance, calling her "ancient" in his review of Mickey; she was only 49 years old at the time of the film's release.

In an article in Photoplay Provost recalled an encounter between her and a belligerent white woman. On a crowded street car, the woman intentionally took up available space in order to prevent Provost from sitting nearby. Provost interrupted the conductor of the street car, who insisted that the woman move her belongings. The woman replied saying that she would rather stand than to sit next to such a woman.

Despite this unease, many in the film business were aware of, and respected Provost's wit, dignity, and talents as an actress. Motion Picture Magazine recounts a chance encounter between Provost and actor Bertram Grassby, who commented on the actress' persona:

The encounter involved Grassby tipping his hat toward Provost, which prompted her to question the meaning of the act. She often poked fun at other actors and directors during the production of a film.

Filmography

References

External links

 

Indian Woman Tells History, from Mack Sennett Weekly, vol. I,  February 12, 1917

1860s births
1984 deaths
Canadian silent film actresses
Cheyenne and Arapaho Tribes people
Place of death unknown
20th-century Canadian actresses
Canadian film actresses
Canadian expatriates in the United States